Espresso House is the largest coffeehouse chain in the Nordic countries. Founded in Lund, Sweden in 1996 by Elisabet and Charles Asker. In March 2018 reached over 460 locations throughout Sweden, Norway, Finland, Denmark, and Germany.

History 
Espresso House was founded by the couple Elisabet and Charles Asker with the coffee bar Café Java in Gothenburg. The first café bearing the name Espresso House opened on street Kyrkogatan in Lund 1996. In 2005 the chain consisted of sixteen different cafes, which in March 2018 had expanded to 430 coffee shops. All bread and pastry served is baked by the central bakery Espresso House Bakery in Malmö.

Organisation 
JAB Holding Company, who in connection with the purchase of Espresso House also bought Baresso Coffee in Denmark, decided during the fall of 2016 that all 45 cafés in the Danish chain would convert to Espresso House.

One thing that's relatively unique for Espresso House is that all coffee houses are corporate-owned, unlike similar chains, like Starbucks, that sometimes use franchising.

Until September 2012, Espresso House was owned by the British private equity firm Palamon Capital Partners, that also acquired the coffee shop chain Coffee Cup that started in Stockholm 1997. The two brands were united under Espresso House. In September 2012, the chain was acquired by the Norwegian private equity firm Herkules Capital that later sold it again in 2015 to the German family business JAB Holding Company.

Locations 
As of February 2022 there were more than 487 stores in the following countries:

Impact
Espresso House has been compared to Starbucks in North America in regards to its ubiquity and spread.  In Norway, the chain has become a symbol of gentrification and "commercial monoculture".

In January 2022 the Finnish investigative journalism show M.O.T reported multiple occasions of mismanagement, hygiene related issues and employees having monthly working hours exceeding lawful limits.

Gallery

References

External links

  
 (in English via Google Translate)

Coffeehouses and cafés in Sweden
Companies based in Stockholm
1996 establishments in Sweden